Lancun may refer to these places in China:

Lancun Township, Hunan, Mayang Miao Automous County, Hunan
Lancun Township, Shanxi, Xinfu District, Xinzhou, Shanxi
Lancun Subdistrict, Jimo District, Qingdao, Shandong